is a fictional character in Namco Bandai's Tekken series and the main antagonist of the Tekken 5 and unplayable final boss. While he is first made playable in the PlayStation 3 version of Tekken 5: Dark Resurrection (albeit as a bonus character), his full playable appearance is in Tekken Tag Tournament 2. A legendary martial artist, once known as "the strongest fist" Jinpachi founded the mega corporation Mishima Zaibatsu decades before the start of the series. He lost control over his company to his son, Heihachi, approximately 50 years before the series started and 10 years later was imprisoned under the Mishima family temple, Hon-maru, where he died of starvation several years later. He was resurrected and possessed by a demon, and retook the Mishima Zaibatsu during Heihachi's absence in Tekken 5.

Appearances

In video games
Jinpachi Mishima was the original founder of the Mishima Zaibatsu and the father of Heihachi, father-in-law of Kazumi Mishima, paternal grandfather of Kazuya and Lars Alexandersson, adoptive paternal grandfather of Lee Chaolan and paternal great-grandfather of Jin Kazama. Unlike most Mishima (who were ruthless and power hungry), Jinpachi was a man of honor and wisdom as he showed compassion to his grandson Kazuya when the latter was a child (this is possibly another reason Heihachi resented Jinpachi so much) and was friends with Wang Jinrei. However, Jinpachi's life took a turn for the worse when the greedy Heihachi staged a coup d'état and stole the company from him. Jinpachi attempted to retake the company when Heihachi entered the military industry (possibly sometime after the death of his daughter-in-law Kazumi Mishima during the same year), but failed and was imprisoned underneath a Mishima compound, Hon-Maru. He died due to starvation after some years. Before his debut, Jinpachi never makes an appearance, although his existence is hinted multiple times, as his friend, Wang's participation in the second tournament is motivated by Jinpachi's wish, and his gravestone is also shown in Wang's ending in Tekken 2.

In Tekken 5, having been resurrected and taken over by a demon as well as granted incredible supernatural powers, Jinpachi breaks out of Honmaru when the temple is destroyed during a battle between Heihachi, Kazuya and an army of Jack-4s sent to kill Heihachi in which the Jacks explode, pulverizing the Hon-maru and freeing Jinpachi from his underground prison. With the news of Heihachi's apparent demise, Jinpachi takes over the company from behind the scenes and organizes the fifth King of Iron Fist Tournament under the orders of the demon, that told him to destroy the world and seek out the souls of the strong, even though he wanted to refuse this command, he obeyed due to lack of energy.

In the tournament finals, Jinpachi is confronted by his great-grandson, Jin who defeats him and puts him to rest at last. Though not playable, Jinpachi briefly appears in the Scenario Campaign prologue of Tekken 6, which retells the events from previous games in a comic book-style format, and he is also mentioned in the prologues and epilogues of several characters in recent mainline games, such as Jin and Wang.

He returns in Tekken Tag Tournament 2 as a playable character and as one of the Stage 7 sub-bosses, alongside Heihachi. He reprises his role as one of the unplayable Stage 7 sub-bosses in Tekken Revolution. In Street Fighter X Tekken, Dhalsim's Swap Costume is based on Jinpachi's appearance.

Character design
Jinpachi is as a tall, muscular old man with a long beard and hair similar to his son, Heihachi, albeit much longer. He is one of the oldest human characters in the Tekken series, being around the same age as his friend, Wang Jinrei, who is about 102 years old in Tekken 5, the game Jinpachi debuted in. He wears a large golden necklace, a pair of golden bracelets on his arms and legs and a cloak pants. In his devil form in Tekken 5, Jinpachi has a purple aura around him, his height slightly increases, his skin becomes dark purple, his eyes glow yellow, and his necklace and bracelets disappear. He also gains spikes on his elbows, two spiked humps on his back and a large mouth on his stomach, from which he shoot fireballs.

In his alternate devil form in Tekken 5: Dark Resurrection, instead of purple aura and skin, Jinpachi has a flaming aura, his skin is dark brown and yellow, and lava-like substance sprouts from all over his body. Although he still has the spikes and mouth from his original devil form, his face is now almost unrecognizable, he loses his beard and hair in exchange for a flaming spike, and his eyes are fiery white with no pupils instead of merely glowing yellow.

Originally Jinpachi was supposed to be the origin of the Mishima curse, the Devil gene, proven by his in-game appearance with Devil traits, his ending text in which it says "Jinpachi's mind is consumed by the Devil" and Devil Jin's interlude with Jinpachi has them talk about Devil, as well Devil Jin's non-canon ending sharing elements from Kazuya's non-canon ending from Tekken 4, in which Devil Jin turns in Devil after absorbing Jinpachi's demon similarly to Kazuya turning into Devil after absorbing Jin's Devil.

Gameplay
Jinpachi's gameplay is similar to the other Mishima characters, which involves many fast attacks and juggles. He shares many moves with Heihachi and Kazuya, including the iconic Electric Wind God Fist move; however, his executions of several moves range from having little to vast differences than both of them. In his unplayable Tekken 5 appearance, Jinpachi has an array of unblockable moves, one of which is a fireball attack that Jinpachi fires from the mouth of his abdomen. The fireball has a very long range and can deplete more than half of the player's health; the best way to avoid the fireballs is through sidestepping, although it can be avoided by other means depending on the character, such as by using Xiaoyu's somersault move or Steve's dodges and sways. Another of his unblockable move is an ability to disrupt an opponent by stunning their motion, which hits the opponent at every range regardless of them being on the ground or airborne. This move leaves the opponent open to any attack Jinpachi decides to throw at them. Jinpachi also has a move in which he absorbs a small part of his opponent's health, as well as a teleporting move that temporarily makes him unable to be hit while doing so. While his boss appearance in Tekken 5: Dark Resurrection is mostly the same as Tekken 5, his playable appearance in the PS3 version tones him down considerably as he is slower, weaker, and has a minuscule movelist compared to other characters.

In Tekken Tag Tournament 2, Jinpachi's moveset is drastically altered to balance him as a playable character. He loses many of his unblockable moves like the stun attack and health absorption, and his fireballs do a lot less damage than it did before; in return, he gains a variety of new moves, including properly using his teleportation move as a stance than can be chained to other attacks. He also has new stances, such as the ability to fly.

In other media
Though Jinpachi does not appear in the 2010 film, he is mentioned (though not by name) as having been imprisoned and murdered by Heihachi (who had a similar personality in this film) many years prior to the film's events.

Reception
Nintendo Power listed Jinpachi Mishima as having one of the best mustaches in video games. In 2010, Complex ranked Jinpachi as the "37th lamest video game boss, commenting "His attacks did huge damage, and his moves were faster than most jabs—because we were unable to unlock him as a playable character without cheating." That same year, Complex placed Jinpachi's stomach-mouth 6th in their list of the craziest moments in the Tekken series. GamesRadar listed a matchup between Jinpachi and Gouken as one of their "12 matchups we want to see in Street Fighter X Tekken", claiming "Roided out Rumble in the retirement home!". VentureBeat placed Jinpachi at 2nd place in their list "5 Fighting-Game Bosses Cheaper Than SF4′s Seth", commenting "He possesses an unblockable fireball that takes out half your lifebar, along with teleports, stun thrusts, and a bear hug that gives him many ways to punish button-mashing." Den of Geek ranked Jinpachi as the "20 greatest Tekken character", stating "as a straight-up boss, nobody feels larger-than-life and threatening than this demonic would-be world-breaker."

References

Fictional businesspeople in video games
Demon characters in video games
Fictional business executives
Fictional commanders
Fictional Japanese people in video games
Fictional karateka
Male characters in video games
Male video game villains
Namco antagonists
Tekken characters
Video game bosses
Video game characters introduced in 2004
Video game characters with superhuman strength
Video game characters who can move at superhuman speeds
Video game characters with electric or magnetic abilities
Video game characters with fire or heat abilities
Video game characters who can teleport